Ndjolé is the capital town in the Abanga-Bigne Department in Gabon, lying northeast of Lambaréné on the Ogooué River, the N2 road and the Trans-Gabon Railway.  It is known as a base for logging and as a transport hub.  Ndjolé is the last city that can be reached by barge traffic traveling up the Ogooué River.  Above Ndjolé there are rapids on the river.

History 
In 1883, Pierre Savorgnan de Brazza founded the military post of Ndjolé, a strategic point located on the Ogooué River.

The river being difficult to navigate upstream, it is here that foresters loaded their wood to bring it down to Port-Gentil.

The N'djolé prison, built in 1898 on an island on the Ogooué, opposite Ndjolé, was part of a French policy to build detention centres in the French overseas departments and territories then in the colonies. It was here that Samory Touré, founder and leader of the short-lived Wassoulou Empire, died in captivity. Alongside Samory Touré, Cheikh Amadou Bamba Mbacké also experienced exile and forced labour there.

Further reading 
 Petringa, Maria. Brazza, A Life for Africa. Bloomington, IN: AuthorHouse, 2006. .  Describes Pierre Savorgnan de Brazza's extensive explorations of Gabon and surrounding countries.

Populated places in Moyen-Ogooué Province
Abanga-Bigne Department